The South African national cricket team toured Zimbabwe in October 1995 and played a one-match Test series against the Zimbabwean national cricket team. South Africa won the Test series 1–0. South Africa were captained by Hansie Cronje and Zimbabwe by Andy Flower. In addition, the teams played a two-match series of Limited Overs Internationals (LOI) which South Africa won 2–0.

Test series summary

1st Test

One Day Internationals (ODIs)

1st ODI

2nd ODI

References

1995 in South African cricket
1995 in Zimbabwean cricket
South African cricket tours of Zimbabwe
International cricket competitions from 1994–95 to 1997
Zimbabwean cricket from 1980–81 to 1999–2000